Salahuddin Ahmed (born 1960/61) is a Bangladesh Nationalist Party politician who served as the state minister of communication and a member of parliament from Cox's Bazar-1 constituency during 2001–2006. He was the spokesperson of the party. In 2015, he disappeared in Dhaka and reappeared three months later in Shillong, India under Indian police custody. In 2018, he was acquitted by the Indian court.

Career
Ahmed served as the assistant personal secretary to the then Prime Minister Khaleda Zia when BNP came to power in 1991. He was later appointed as the state minister of communication during 2001–2006 in the Second Khaleda Cabinet.

In January 2008, Ahmed was sentenced to 7 years of imprisonment for taking Tk 1 crore in bribe from Mir Zahir Hossain, owner of construction firm Mir Akter Hossain Ltd. According to the charge, the bribe was taken in February 2005.

Ahmed served as the Joint General Secretary of Bangladesh Nationalist Party. In January 2015, he was appointed spokesperson of Bangladesh Nationalist Party by Khaleda Zia after Rizvi Ahmed, the previous spokesperson, was arrested by Bangladesh Police.

Disappearance
In March 2015, Ahmed disappeared in Uttara, Dhaka. The Bangladesh Nationalist Party claimed he had been arrested by law enforcement agencies in Bangladesh and according to witness by Rapid Action Battalion. He reappeared two months later in Shillong, Meghalaya, India. He was arrested by the Indian Police and charged under the Foreigners Act for entering India illegally. On 3 June 2015, he was charged by Shillong Police and was interned in North Eastern Indira Gandhi Regional Institute of Health and Medical Sciences where he was receiving treatment. More than 3 years later, in October 2018, East Khashi Hill District and Sessions Judge's Court in Meghalaya, India acquitted him over the trespassing case. While in the Indian jail, Bangladesh Nationalist Party appointed him as a member of its standing committee.

Personal life
Ahmed is married to Hasina Ahmed, with two sons and two daughters.

References

Living people
1960s births
Bangladesh Nationalist Party politicians
Communications ministers of Bangladesh
Place of birth missing (living people)
8th Jatiya Sangsad members
7th Jatiya Sangsad members